Enterprise junction may refer to:

 Enterprise junction, former name of Benson Junction, Florida
 Enterprise junction, a New Jersey railroad junction